is a Japanese geologist and a professor emeritus from the Faculty of Science of the University of the Ryukyus, Okinawa, Japan.

Biography
Masaaki Kimura graduated in science at the Faculty of Fisheries of the University of Tokyo (1963) and obtained a Doctorate in marine geology (1968).  He has worked for the University of Tokyo's Ocean Research Institute, the Geological Survey of Japan, the Agency of Industrial Science and Technology of the Ministry of International Trade and Industry of Japan, and Columbia University's Lamont–Doherty Earth Observatory. He  taught at the University of the Ryukyus from 1977 to 2002.  He has since retired from that University and is now
general director of Marine Science and Culture Heritage Research Association.

Research
His specialties are marine geology, geophysics, seismology, volcanology, and marine archaeology. He has extensively researched the formation of the Okinawa Trough, and claimed to have predicted the volcanic eruptions in Miyake Island (1983), Izu Ōshima (1986), and Mount Unzen (1991).

Apart from his geological research, Kimura is best known to the world for his exploration of underwater structures which he claims are ruins of an ancient civilization. These structures  were identified by local divers in 1988. In 1992 he studied the so-called Yonaguni Monument and other formations off the coast of Yonaguni, the westernmost of the Ryukyus.  In a report given to the 21st Pacific Science Congress in 2007 he suggested that it had been built 2,000 to 3,000 years ago as the sea level then was close to current levels.

Publications
 
 
 
 
 
 
 
 
 
 
 
 
 
 
 
 
 
 
 
 
 
 
 
 
 
 
 
 
 
 
 
 A Continent Lost in the Pacific Ocean - Riddle of the Submarine Ruins in the Ryukyu Islands - Tokyo 1998
 
 
 
 
 
 
 
 Diving Survey Report for Submarine Ruins Off Yonaguni, Japan

References

Living people
University of Tokyo alumni
Year of birth missing (living people)